USS Luster (IX‑82), was a yacht which served in the United States Navy as a patrol boat during World War II.

She was built as Ko‑Asa in 1936 by M. M. Davis & Sons of Solomons, Maryland, and purchased by the Navy from George Marshall Allen of New York City on 21 July 1942; and placed in service on 14 August 1942.

Service history
Renamed Luster on 2 September 1942, the converted yacht was assigned to the 7th Naval District Local Defense Force, Port Everglades section, on 14 August. She was attached to the Gulf Sea Frontier Force primarily for ASW patrols on the east coast of Florida.

She was placed out of service on 24 March 1943, and assigned to the Supervisor of Salvage, USN, Miami, on 22 January 1944 to be operated by Merritt-Chapman & Scott Corp. with a civilian crew.

She was placed out of service a second time on 26 June 1944 and laid up at Coast Guard Patrol Base, Port Everglades. She was transferred to the War Shipping Administration on 20 December 1944 and sold.

References

External links
 Photo gallery at navsource.org

Unclassified miscellaneous vessels of the United States Navy
Ships built in Solomons, Maryland
1936 ships